Loch Garry is a large upland freshwater loch located in Perth and Kinross in Scotland, within the Forest of Atholl just to the south of the Cairngorms National Park.

Loch Garry Project
A study of the arctic char population of the loch conducted by Ron Greer between 1972 and 1974 concluded that it had become ecologically impoverished as a result of the loss of living and dead plant material from the shallow littoral zone. In 1986, the Loch Garry Project was established to undertake a programme of tree-planting around the loch.

References

Garry
Tay catchment
Garry